This is a list of works by Kahlil Gibran, including writings and the visual arts.

Writings

Writings published in periodicals:

Correspondence
A Self-Portrait (edited and translated by Anthony R. Ferris, 1959, New York)
 Beloved Prophet, The love letters of Khalil Gibran and Mary Haskell, and her private journal (edited by Virginia Hilu, 1972, New York)
 Blue Flame: The Love Letters of Kahlil Gibran to May Ziadah (edited and translated by Suheil Bushrui and Salma Kuzbari, 1983, London)

Other collections

Prose Poems (1934)
Secrets of the Heart (1947)
A Treasury of Kahlil Gibran (1951)
Thoughts and Meditations (1960)
A Second Treasury of Kahlil Gibran (1962)
Spiritual Sayings (1962)
Voice of the Master (1963)
Mirrors of the Soul (1965)
Between Night & Morn (1972)
A Third Treasury of Kahlil Gibran (1975)
The Storm (1994)
The Beloved (1994)
The Vision (1994)
The Eye of the Prophet (1995)
The Treasured Writings of Kahlil Gibran (1995)

Visual art

References

Sources

 
 
 

Kahlil Gibran
Gibran, Kahlil
Gibran, Kahlil